Craspedocephalus borneensis, commonly known as the Bornean pit viper, is a venomous pit viper species endemic to the island of Borneo. No subspecies are currently recognized.

Description
Scalation includes 19–21 rows of dorsal scales at midbody, 152–180 ventral scales, undivided anal scale, 45–58 divided subcaudal scales, and 8–11 supralabial scales.

Its coloration varies. Individuals may be brown with darker brown saddles, or light brown with a few darker markings, or even bright yellow with darker markings.

Adults may attain  in snout-vent length (SVL).

Geographic range
Craspedocephalus borneensis is found on the island of Borneo (Brunei, Kalimantan, Sabah, Sarawak) as well as in the Natuna Islands.

The type locality given is "Sarawack" (= Sarawak, Borneo).

Habitat
Even though the tail is prehensile, adults are usually on the forest floor. Juveniles may be in low vegetation.

Diet
Craspedocephalus borneensis preys upon small rodents and small birds.

Reproduction
Whether this species of Craspedocephalus lays eggs or bears live young is as yet unknown.

References

Further reading
Peters, W. 1872. Übersicht der von den Herren M.se G. Doria und D.r O. Beccari in Sarawack auf Borneo von 1865 bis 1868 gesammelten Amphibien. Annali del Museo Civico di Storia Naturale di Genova, Series 1, 3: 27-45. ("Atropophis borneensis n. sp.", pp. 41–42.)

Reptiles described in 1872
Taxa named by Wilhelm Peters
borneensis
Endemic fauna of Borneo
Reptiles of Brunei
Reptiles of Indonesia
Reptiles of Malaysia
Reptiles of Borneo